Bill Kennedy (25 July 1882 – 2 September 1970) was an Australian rules footballer who played with St Kilda in the Victorian Football League (VFL).

References

External links 

1882 births
1970 deaths
Australian rules footballers from Victoria (Australia)
St Kilda Football Club players